John William Clouser (born March 29, 1932) was an American robber who was on the FBI Ten Most Wanted Fugitives list in 1965.

Background
A former police officer and detective in Orlando, Florida, Clouser was added on the list on January 7, 1965 and removed when a federal process against him was dismissed in 1972. He was previously committed to a mental hospital after being arrested for kidnapping and armed robbery, which he later escaped in April 1964. Clouser surrendered to law enforcement on August 21, 1974. He later authored a book, The Most Wanted Man in America detailing the time he eluded authorities while on the list.

References

1932 births
American escapees
FBI Ten Most Wanted Fugitives
Fugitives
Living people